SM U-116 was a German Type 115 U-boat of the Imperial German Navy built at Schichau-Werke, Danzig. As her sister ship , she was never completed and ultimately broken up in Danzig after the Armistice with Germany.  Her main engines were used in M/S Adolf Sommerfeld ex . Both boats had been offered to the IGN free of charge by Schichau in an attempt to gain experience in building submarines (Williamson, 15).

References

Notes

Citations

Bibliography

Gordon Williamson, U-boats of the Kaiser's Navy. Osprey, 2002, 
R.H. Gibson, Maurice Prendergast, The German Submarine War 1914–1918, Periscope Publishing Ltd., 2002, p. 114
Eberhard Rössler, The U-boat: the evolution and technical history of German submarines, Naval Institute Press, 1981, p. 56
Stefan Lipsky, Florian Lipsky, Deutsche U-Boote: hundert Jahre Technik und Entwicklung, Mittler, 2006, p. 85

World War I submarines of Germany
Ships built in Elbing
Type U 115 submarines
Ships built by Schichau
1918 ships